The 15th Northwest Territories Legislative Assembly was the 23rd sitting legislature or council in Northwest Territories history. It lasted from 2003 until September 3, 2007. The primary membership was elected in the 2003 Northwest Territories general election. There were two by-elections conducted during the interim.

Joe Handley was Premier. David Krutko, then Paul Delorey were Speakers during the sitting.

Members elected in the twentieth general election

Members elected in by-elections
 Robert C. McLeod replaced Roger Allen in Inuvik Twin Lakes, November 29, 2004
Resignation of Roger Allen
 Jackson Lafferty replaced Henry Zoe in North Slave, July 18, 2005
Resignation of Henry Zoe

See also
 List of Northwest Territories Legislative Assemblies
 List of Northwest Territories general elections
 Speaker of the Legislative Assembly of Northwest Territories

References

External links
 Legislative Assembly of the Northwest Territories